Rajura Assembly constituency is one of the six constituencies of the Maharashtra Vidhan Sabha located in the Chandrapur district.

It is a part of the Chandrapur (Lok Sabha constituency) along with five other assembly constituencies, viz  Warora (Assembly constituency), Ballarpur, Chnadrapur(SC) from Chandrapur district and Wani, Arni from the neighbouring Yavatmal district.

Members of Legislative Assembly

See also
Rajura
Korpana
Jiwati

References

Assembly constituencies of Maharashtra